John Meehan (born 1950) is an Australian ballet director, choreographer, professor, and retired ballet dancer. He was educated at the Anglican Church Grammar School in Brisbane and studied at the Australian Ballet School. Meehan joined the Australian Ballet in 1970 and was promoted to principal dancer in 1974, creating roles in several works, including Ronald Hynd's The Merry Widow. He danced also with American Ballet Theatre from 1977 to 1980 and later was a guest artist with National Ballet of Canada and the New York City Ballet.

Meehan's choreography is in the repertoire of the Australian Ballet, American Ballet Theatre, The Washington Ballet, the Metropolitan Opera, the Hong Kong Ballet and the Royal Winnipeg Ballet. Meehan was subsequently appointed as the artistic director of the Royal Winnipeg Ballet between 1990 and 1993 and the American Ballet Theatre Studio Company from 1997 to 2006. He was the artistic director of Hong Kong Ballet between July 2006 to 2009 before accepting a teaching position at Vassar College where he now chairs the Vassar Dance Department.

Meehan has served twice as the President of the Jury at the Prix de Lausanne (2004 and 2006) and is regularly invited as a judge for the Youth America Grand Prix and the USA International Ballet Competition.

Interviews 
 Ballet Magazine, November 2006

References

External links 
  
  Vassar College department of dance
 Archival footage of Balanchine's Agon in 1986 performed by John Meehan and Merrill Ashley at Jacob's Pillow
 
  Indianapolis City Ballet

1950 births
Australian male ballet dancers
Jacqueline Kennedy Onassis School faculty
Living people
Australian Ballet School alumni
People educated at Anglican Church Grammar School